The Thomonde Formation is a geologic formation in Haiti. It preserves fossils dating back to the Early to Middle Miocene period.

See also 

 List of fossiliferous stratigraphic units in Haiti

References

Further reading 
 M. J. Rathbun. 1923. Fossil Crabs from the Republic of Haiti. Proceedings of the United States National Museum 63:1-6
 H. E. Vokes and E. H. Vokes. 1968. Variation in the genus Orthaulax (Mollusca: Gastropoda). Tulane Studies in Geology and Paleontology 6(2):71-84

Geologic formations of the Caribbean
Geology of Haiti
Neogene Caribbean